George Boas (28 August 1891 – 17 March 1980) was a professor of philosophy at Johns Hopkins University. He received his education at Brown University, obtaining both a BA and MA in philosophy there, after which he studied shortly at Columbia, and finally at UC Berkeley, where he earned his PhD in 1917.

In 1921, Boas was hired at Johns Hopkins by Professor Arthur Oncken Lovejoy as an historian of philosophy. The same year Boas married sculptor Simone Brangier Boas. Boas' tenure at Hopkins was interrupted by the Second World War, in which he served as a Commander in the Naval Reserve. One of his undergraduate students was Alger Hiss, with whom he kept in contact.

Boas was elected to the American Philosophical Society in 1950.

In 1952 at Johns Hopkins, Owen Lattimore was indicted by the McCarran Committee for perjury. At Boas' initiative, a Lattimore Defense Fund was set up in January 1953 with the goal to gather funds to pay for the legal fees of the defense.

He retired from the school in 1956, continuing his scholarly career with a fellowship at the Center for the Humanities at Wesleyan University and as visiting Andrew W. Mellon chair at the University of Pittsburgh. He was elected to the American Academy of Arts and Sciences in 1957.

Major works
The Major Traditions of European Philosophy (1929)
A Primer for Critics (1937)
The Hieroglyphics of Horapollo, translation of the original work (1950)
Dominant Themes in Modern Philosophy (1957)
The Inquiring Mind (1959)
Rationalism in Greek Philosophy (1961)
The Limits of Reason Harper & Brothers (1961)
The Heaven of Invention (1962)
The cult of childhood. London, Warburg Institute (1966)
Vox Populi (1969)
The History of Ideas: An Introduction (1969)
Wingless Pegasus A Handbook for Critics (1950)
What is a Picture, with Harold Wrenn (1964)

See also
American philosophy
List of American philosophers
Theriophily

References

External links
 

1891 births
1980 deaths
Johns Hopkins University faculty
Wesleyan University faculty
20th-century American philosophers
Brown University alumni
Members of the American Philosophical Society